Bohol–Panglao International Airport, also known as New Bohol International Airport, is an international airport on Panglao Island in the province of Bohol, Philippines. The airport opened on November 28, 2018 after decades of planning and three years of construction, replacing Tagbilaran Airport to support Bohol's increased passenger traffic due to tourism. The airport serves as the gateway to Tagbilaran and the rest of mainland Bohol for domestic air travellers. It also is less than an hour's flight from Mactan–Cebu International Airport, which is a gateway to central Philippines for international tourists.

Dubbed as the first eco-airport in the Philippines and the country's green gateway, the airport is located at a  site in Barangay Tawala in Panglao.

While the airport is billed as an international airport, it is classified as Class 1 principal domestic airport by the Civil Aviation Authority of the Philippines.

History

Planning and funding
The first feasibility study of the airport was conducted in 2000 during the Estrada administration. On September 4, 2012, President Benigno Aquino III, head of the NEDA Board of the Philippines, approved a resolution giving the green light for the construction of the airport. The proposed airport was to be funded through Official Development Assistance (ODA) instead of the Public-Private Partnership (PPP), an infrastructure-building program of the government of the Philippines wherein the private sector may participate in any of the schemes authorized by its build-operate-transfer law.

On March 27, 2013, the Japan International Cooperation Agency signed an agreement with the Republic of the Philippines to build the Bohol–Panglao International Airport at 10.78 billion yen under the project name New Bohol Airport Construction and Sustainable Environment Protection Project. The signing signaled the roll out for the construction of a new airport in the province of Bohol at an island adjacent to Tagbilaran Airport. Despite the location of the airport, which is just outside of Tagbilaran, it adapted the IATA code: TAG from the old airport, which was located in the heart of Tagbilaran.

Construction
Initially, the airport's cost was pegged at ₱4.8 billion pesos to build but was later increased.

On June 9, 2014, six Japanese firms submitted bids for construction of the proposed airport at a cost of ₱7.14 billion to be funded from official development assistance (ODA) loan from the Japan International Cooperation Agency. On December 15, the Department of Transportation and Communications started its search for bidders to bid out for the operations and maintenance (and future extension) of the airport under a concession model.

Construction of the airport started on June 22, 2015 following the selection of Japanese Airport Consultants (JAC) for the design and consultancy work on the project, and the consortium of Chiyoda Corporation and Mitsubishi Corporation as the prime contractor for the construction of the project.

In its initial plan, the project was expected to finish in 2016, but the opening was delayed. Prior to the 2018 opening, the airport was slated to be completed by 2021.

Opening
Philippines AirAsia operated a special flight using its Airbus A320 to the new airport, becoming the first airline to land at the airport hours before its inauguration on November 27, 2018. The airport was then inaugurated by then President Rodrigo Duterte on the same day. The first commercial flight to land was Cebu Pacific Flight 619, an Airbus A320 from Ninoy Aquino International Airport in Manila, which landed at past 7:30 a.m. PST the following day.

The first international flight to land at the airport was a chartered Royal Air Philippines A320 flight from Hong Kong International Airport at 4:45 p.m. PST on September 30, 2019. Meanwhile, Jeju Air Flight 4407, a Boeing 737-800 from Incheon International Airport, landed as the first commercial international flight at the airport on November 21 at 11:28 a.m. PST.

Structures and facilities

Runway
The airport has a  asphalt runway that runs in a 030°/210° direction. Taxiways E3 and E4 serve as access to the apron from the runway.

To make the airport capable of night operations, an instrument landing system and other navigational equipment were installed in 2019.

Terminal and apron
During construction, the original plan was to construct a single level for the terminal. In 2016, the Bohol provincial government pushed for a plan to install jet bridges to provide easier access to the airport, hence, a second level was constructed. There are three jet bridges installed at the airport. The terminal also sports a wave roof design inspired by the Chocolate Hills.

The airport uses natural ventilation and solar power for one-third of its power supply.

The concrete apron features a total of four parking bays for wide-body aircraft as large as the Boeing 777 and Airbus A330 or a maximum of seven parking bays for narrow-body aircraft like the Airbus A320 and A321.

Airlines and destinations

Statistics
Data from Civil Aviation Authority of the Philippines (CAAP).

An em dash (—) is used when data from CAAP is not available.

Notes

See also
List of airports in the Philippines

References

External links

 Official website
 New Bohol Airport Profile at Public-Private Partnership Center

Airports in the Philippines
Buildings and structures in Bohol
Japan International Cooperation Agency
Airports established in 2018
2018 establishments in the Philippines
Transportation in Bohol